Diduga ciliata is a moth of the family Erebidae first described by Jeremy Daniel Holloway in 2001. It is found on Borneo.

The length of the forewings is about 5 mm.

References

Nudariina
Moths described in 2001